ViuTV News is the flagship evening news programme on Hong Kong English language television channel ViuTVsix and is produced by Now News.

Prior to 30 November 2020, HK Television Entertainment broadcast the English news programme "News Roundup" which was produced by Reuters. On 30 November 2020, HK Television Entertainment terminated their contract with Reuters and switched to produce English news on their own, under Now News. The programme continues to use provided clips by Now News with foreign clips being provided by The Associated Press. The new programme no longer has an anchor to report the news.

Main newscasters (Reuters era)

Relief newscasters (Reuters era)

References 

2017 establishments in Hong Kong
ViuTVsix original programming
Television stations in Hong Kong
Television channels and stations established in 2017